Philip Foster Farm is a historic site in Eagle Creek, Oregon, United States, near the city of Estacada. The farm is part of a  land claim purchased in 1847 by American pioneer Philip Foster. Foster built a store, house, barn, and other structures at the farm. The farmhouse and barn still stand, and replicas of the store, blacksmith shop and log cabin have been built on the site.

The Farm is located on the last leg of the Barlow Road, and was an important rest stop for travelers on the Oregon Trail.

Exteriors of the Farm are accessible year-round, with interpretive signage. The website at http://philipfosterfarm.com lists visiting hours to see the interiors, with costumed interpreters.  The site was listed on the National Register of Historic Places in 1980, and hosts thousands of school children each year for their hands-on Pioneer Life field trips. The Jacknife-Zion-Horseheaven Historical Society3, which owns and operates the site, jokes that Foster Farm is the "First destination resort in the Oregon Territory."

Some students at the nearby Summit Learning Charter school come to volunteer and help with tours. They also help with events, and when you arrive at the Farm, are dressed as Pioneers. Coming by is a lovely way to further your child's knowledge of Oregon History.

NON PROFIT STATUS3

The Philip Foster Farm is owned and managed by the Jacknife Zion Horse Heaven Historical Society.  The Society is named for origin and place names for the Estacada Region.  The  Society Accepted responsibility for the farm thru Donation.  The Society board of directors manage policy while paid staff and volunteers manage events.  Events Include:  Pioneer Life Tours (over 6000 participants);  general public tours (over 2000); Live History Camp (5000); Special Events (13,000);  Trails Across Time (11,000).

Special Events include but are not limited to:. Mary Charlotte's Garden Party

The fall Cider Squeeze

Christmas in the Country

References
2. An anonymous employee at Philip Foster Farms.

3.IRS  503c3EIN 93-0704210.see annual tax filing.

External links 
Philip Foster Farm (official website)

Houses on the National Register of Historic Places in Oregon
National Register of Historic Places in Clackamas County, Oregon
Houses completed in 1843
Historic house museums in Oregon
Oregon Trail
Museums in Clackamas County, Oregon
Houses in Clackamas County, Oregon
1843 establishments in Oregon Country
Farms on the National Register of Historic Places in Oregon
Blacksmith shops